Killisick is an area of the market town of Arnold in the ceremonial county of Nottinghamshire in the East Midlands of England. It also used to be a local government ward area of Gedling borough until 2015.  The population of the ward as it stood at the 2011 census was 2,595. The area is currently contained within the newly created Coppice ward.

The area is mostly residential, and contains a few shops and a John Lewis & Partners depot. It borders with Mapperley, Arnold town centre and Woodthorpe. As a ward, Killisick shared borders with the wards known as: Mapperley Plains; Lambley; Woodborough; St. Mary's; Calverton; and Kingswell.

Education
The area contains three primary schools: Killisick Junior School; Pinewood Infant School and Foundation Unit; and Robert Mellors Primary School.

There are no secondary schools in Killisick, but Arnold Hill Academy, Christ the King Catholic Voluntary Academy and Redhill Academy are nearby.

Recreation
Killisick Recreation Ground lies outside Killisick, alongside the area's eastern boundary. The ground contains a playground, an outdoor gym, two grass football pitches and a smaller, fenced tarmac pitch. A funfair is held on the ground every year.

Killisick Community Centre is on Killisick Road.

Bus services

Bus services in Killisick include Nottingham City Transport's Lime Line 56, 56B, 57, 58, N58 and 59.

56: Nottingham – Mansfield Road – Plains Estate – Arnold
The 56 covers Ramsey Drive, Coppice Road and Gedling Road.
56B: Somersby Road, Arnold – Plains Estate – Front Street, Arnold
The 56B covers Ramsey Drive, Coppice Road and Gedling Road.

57 covers: Ramsey Drive, Gedling Road, and Darlton Drive.

58: Nottingham – Mansfield Road – Arnold – Killsick 
The 58 covers Killisick Road, Homefield, and Surgeys Lane.
N58: Nottingham – Mansfield Road – Arnold – Killisick – Plains Estate
The N58 covers Ramsey Drive, Coppice Road and Gedling Road.
59: Nottingham – Mansfield Road – Arnold – Killsick 
The 59 covers Howbeck Road, Rolleston Drive, and Sandfield Road.

References

Populated places in Nottinghamshire
Gedling